Ville Kaunisto (born 19 March 1982) is a Finnish former basketball player and politician. He last played for Kouvot of the Korisliiga and for the Finnish national basketball team. He started his professional career in 1999–00. He was elected to the Parliament of Finland in 2019.

Honours
Kouvot
Korisliiga 
: 2003–04, 2015-16
: 2018-19
: 2009-10
Turun NMKY
Finnish Basketball Cup 
: 1999–00

References

External links
 Player profile at official Finland national team site
Profile on Finnish Parliament site

1982 births
Living people
ADA Blois Basket 41 players
CB Tarragona players
Finnish expatriate basketball people in Spain
Finnish men's basketball players
Fribourg Olympic players
Kouvot players
Lille Métropole BC players
Limoges CSP players
Oviedo CB players
Palencia Baloncesto players
Power forwards (basketball)
Sportspeople from Turku